St. Anthony de Padua Parish School is a historic Catholic school building located in the Southwest Center City neighborhood of Philadelphia, Pennsylvania. It was built in 1897, and is a four-story, red brick building with stone trim in the Romanesque Revival-style. It has rounded arched window openings, a hipped roof with dormer, and freestanding brick fire tower.

It was added to the National Register of Historic Places in 1992. It is currently used as senior housing.

References

School buildings on the National Register of Historic Places in Philadelphia
Romanesque Revival architecture in Pennsylvania
School buildings completed in 1897
Southwest Center City, Philadelphia